Tarragona, officially the Municipality of Tarragona, is a 3rd class municipality in the province of Davao Oriental, Philippines. According to the 2020 census, it has a population of 26,996 people.

Geography

Climate
Tarragona has a tropical rainforest climate (Af) with heavy rainfall year-round.

Barangays

Tarragona is politically subdivided into 10 barangays.
 Cabagayan
 Central (Poblacion)
 Dadong
 Jovellar
 Limot
 Lucatan
 Maganda
 Ompao
 Tomoaong
 Tubaon

Demographics

Economy

References

External links
 Tarragona Profile at the DTI Cities and Municipalities Competitive Index
 [ Philippine Standard Geographic Code]
 Philippine Census Information
 Local Governance Performance Management System

Municipalities of Davao Oriental